Mkigo is an administrative ward in Kigoma District of Kigoma Region in Tanzania. 
In 2016 the Tanzania National Bureau of Statistics report there were 7,478 people in the ward, from 16,252 in 2012. Prior to 2014 Nyarubanda village and its hamlets were are part of the Mikigo Ward until they split off to for their own new ward.

Villages / neighborhoods 
The ward has 8 hamlets.

 Katonyanga
 Kibimba
 Kilemba
 Kumsasa
 Msenga A
 Msenga B
 Mtikamba
 Nyamshisha

References

Wards of Kigoma Region